The Bartlett Dam is a concrete multiple-arch buttress dam on the Verde River, located 50 km northeast of Phoenix, Arizona. The dam creates Bartlett Lake and its primary purpose is irrigation water supply. It was the first dam constructed on the Verde River and the first of its type constructed by the U.S. Bureau of Reclamation. It was built between 1936 and 1939. It was named after Bill Bartlett, a government surveyor.  It was listed on the National Register of Historic Places in 2017.

History

In response to the Great Depression and subsequent drops in crop prices, farmers struggled harder to have a dam constructed on the Verde River. Finally, in 1935, the Salt River Project received approval to build the Bartlett Dam. The U.S. Bureau of Reclamation constructed the dam between 1936 and 1939, in a total of 1,000 days. Upon completion, the dam was the tallest multiple arch buttress type in the world at the time. 80% of the funding for the dam was provided by the Salt River Project (SRP) and 20% by the Bureau of Indian Affairs. Construction on the dam provided needed jobs and flood control on the river. Although flood waters temporarily halted construction in February 1937, flooding was finally minimized with the construction of the dam. The next large flood in the area would not come until the winter of 1965-66.

Because of safety concerns, the dam was later modified during the mid-1990s by the Bureau of Reclamation. Beginning in March 1994, the dam was raised  and subsequently, its service spillway was modified as well to accompany the new height. The new spillway consists of a concrete control structure and a three-segment fuse plug which is designed to erode in specific stages during flooding. The modifications to the dam were complete in December 1996.

Specifications

The Bartlett dam consists of 10 arches, 9 buttresses, and is flanked by 2 gravity wing dams.

References

External links

 SRP Bartlett Dam
 U.S. Bureau of Reclamation – Bartlett Dam
 

Dams in Arizona
Buildings and structures in Maricopa County, Arizona
Buttress dams
United States Bureau of Reclamation dams
Dams completed in 1939
Multiple-arch dams
Historic American Engineering Record in Arizona
1939 establishments in Arizona
National Register of Historic Places in Maricopa County, Arizona
Dams on the National Register of Historic Places in Arizona